Attica Railways was a railway company which operated a metre gauge railway system in Attica, Greece.

The contract between the Greek government and the Hellenic Company of Lavrion Metallurgies was signed in 1882. The line would connect downtown Athens to Eastern Attica terminating at the mining town of Lavrion, with a branch line from Heraklion to Kifissia.

The line from Attiki station to Kifissia (a northern suburb) was opened on February 2, 1885, and was later extended further north to Stofyli. The main line to Lavrion was opened on June 20, 1885. In 1889 the line was extended by  towards the center of Athens, the new terminal station located at Lavrion Square, near Omonoia Square.

The main rolling stock depot and repair workshop were located at Attiki station, with additional facilities at Lavrion.

In 1910 Attica Railways were taken over by the Hellenic Electric Company.

See also

Lavrion Square-Strofyli railway
Athens-Lavrion Railway

Notes and references

Defunct railway companies of Greece
Railway companies established in 1882
Railway companies disestablished in 1910
Rail transport in Attica
Metre gauge railways in Greece
1882 establishments in Greece
1910 disestablishments in Greece